Sweet shells (gavvalu) is one of the typical Indian sweets made in Andhra Pradesh, India. It is a mixture (dough) of plain flour/maida and water or milk. The prepared dough is shaped into small rounds, which are flattened and rolled (on a special tool) so as to take the shape of gavvalu (cowrie shells). These shells are fried in oil or ghee and soaked in sugar or jaggery syrup.

See also
 Kidyo

References

Indian desserts
Andhra cuisine
Indian rice dishes
Deep fried foods